The page lists all of the families in the clade Tetrapoda, organized by taxonomic ranks. This list does not include families that are extinct.

Amphibia

Order Anura (frogs) 

 Suborder Archaeobatrachia
 Family Ascaphidae (tailed frogs)
 Family Bombinatoridae (fire-belly toads)
 Family Discoglossidae (painted frogs)
 Family Leiopelmatidae (New Zealand primitive frogs)
 Suborder Mesobatrachia
 Family Megophryidae (litter frogs)
 Family Pelobatidae (European spadefoot toads)
 Family Pelodytidae (parsley frogs)
 Family Pipidae (tongueless frogs)
 Family Rhinophrynidae (Mexican burrowing toad)
 Family Scaphiopodidae (American spadefoot toads)
 Suborder Neobatrachia
 Family Allophrynidae (Tukeit Hill frog)
 Family Amphignathodontidae (marsupial frogs)
 Family Arthroleptidae (screeching frogs)
 Family Brachycephalidae (saddleback toads)
 Family Bufonidae (true toads)
 Family Centrolenidae (glass frogs)
 Family Dendrobatidae (poison dart frogs)
 Family Heleophrynidae (ghost frogs)
 Family Hemisotidae (shovelnose frogs)
 Family Hylidae (tree frogs)
 Family Hyperoliidae (sedge or bush frogs)
 Family Leptodactylidae (Southern frogs)
 Family Mantellidae (a diverse family of frogs)
 Family Microhylidae (narrow mouthed frogs)
 Family Myobatrachidae (Australian ground frogs)
 Family Ranidae (true frogs)
 Family Rhacophoridae (moss frogs)
 Family Rhinodermatidae (Darwin's frog)
 Family Sooglossidae (Seychelles frogs)

Order Apoda (caecilians) 

 Family Caeciliidae (common caecilians)
 Family Chikilidae (Indian caecilians)
 Family Dermophiidae
 Family Herpelidae
 Family Ichthyophiidae (Asian tailed caecilians)
 Family Indotyphlidae
 Family Rhinatrematidae (Neotropical tailed caecilians)
 Family Scolecomorphidae (African tropical caecilians)
 Family Siphonopidae
 Family Typhlonectidae (aquatic caecilians)

Order Urodela (salamanders) 

 Suborder Cryptobranchoidea
 Family Cryptobranchidae (giant salamanders)
 Family Hynobiidae (Asiatic salamanders)

 Suborder Salamandroidea
 Family Ambystomatidae (mole salamanders)
 Family Amphiumidae (amphiumas or congo eels)
 Family Dicamptodontidae (Pacific giant salamanders)
 Family Plethodontidae (lungless salamanders)
 Family Proteidae (mudpuppies and waterdogs)
 Family Rhyacotritonidae (torrent salamanders)
 Family Salamandridae (true salamanders and newts)

 Suborder Sirenoidea
 Family Sirenidae (sirens)

Aves

Superorder Galloanserae

Order Galliformes (gamebirds, or landfowl) 

 Family Cracidae (chachalacas or guans)
 Family Megapodiidae (megapodes)
 Family Numididae (guineafowls)
 Family Odontophoridae (New World quails)
 Family Phasianidae (pheasants, chickens, Old World quails, and more)

Order Anseriformes (waterfowl) 

 Family Anatidae (duck, geese, swans, and more)
 Family Anhimidae (screamers)
 Family Anseranatidae (magpie-goose)

Superorder Neoaves

Order Phoenicopteriformes (flamingos and extinct relatives) 

 Family Phoenicopteridae (flamingos)

Order Podicipediformes (grebes) 

 Family Podicipedidae

Order Columbiformes (pigeons and doves) 

 Family Columbidae

Order Mesitornithiformes (mesites) 

 Family Mesitornithidae

Order Pterocliformes (sandgrouses) 

 Family Pteroclidae

Order Apodiformes (swifts and hummingbirds) 

 Family Apodidae (swifts)
 Family Hemiprocnidae (treeswifts)
 Family Trochilidae (hummingbirds)

Order Caprimulgiformes (frogmouths, nightjars, and more)

 Family Aegothelidae (owlet-nightjar)
 Family Caprimulgidae (potoos)
 Family Nyctibiidae (nightjars)
 Family Podargidae (frogmouth)
 Family Steatornithidae (oilbird)

Order Cuculiformes (cuckoos) 

 Family Cuculidae

Order Otidiformes (bustards) 

 Family Otididae

Order Musophagiformes (turacos) 

 Family Musophagidae

Order Opisthocomiformes (hoatzin) 

 Family Opisthocomidae

Order Gruiformes (cranes and relatives) 

 Family Aptornithidae (adzebills) 
 Family Aramidae (limpkin)
 Family Gruidae (cranes)
 Family Heliornithidae (finfoots and sungrebe)
 Family Psophiidae (trumpeters)
 Family Rallidae (rails)
 Family Sarothruridae (flufftails)

Order Charadriiformes (waders and gulls) 

 Suborder Charadrii (plover-like waders)
 Family Charadriidae (plovers and lapwings)
 Family Haematopodidae (oystercatchers)
 Family Ibidorhynchidae (ibisbill)
 Family Recurvirostridae (avocets and stilts)
 Suborder Chionidi (thick-knees and allies)
 Family Burhinidae (thick-knees)
 Family Chionididae (sheathbills)
 Family Pluvianellidae (Magellanic plover)
 Suborder Lari (gulls and allies)
 Family Alcidae (puffins, guillemots, murres, and allies)
 Family Dromadidae (crab plover)
 Family Glareolidae (pratincoles and coursers)
 Family Laridae (gulls, terns, and skimmers)
 Family Pluvianidae (Egyptian plover)
 Family Stercorariidae (skuas)
 Suborder Scolopaci (snipe-like waders)
 Family Scolopacidae (snipe, sandpipers, phalaropes, and allies)
 Suborder Thinocori (aberrant charadriforms)
 Family Jacanidae (jacanas)
 Family Pedionomidae (plains wanderer)
 Family Rostratulidae (painted snipe)
 Family Thinocoridae (seedsnipe)
 Suborder Turnici (buttonquails)
 Family Turnicidae (buttonquails)

Order Gaviiformes (loons) 

 Family Gaviidae

Order Procellariiformes (petrels, including albatrosses and more) 

 Family Diomedeidae  (albatrosses)
 Family Hydrobatidae  (storm petrels)
 Family Oceanitidae  (austral storm petrels)
 Family Pelecanoididae (diving petrels)
 Family Procellariidae  (fulmars, petrels, and shearwaters)

Order Sphenisciformes (penguins) 

 Family Spheniscidae

Order Ciconiiformes (storks) 

 Family Ciconiidae

Order Pelecaniformes (boobies, cormorants, darters, and more) 

 Family Ardeidae (herons)
 Family Balaenicipitidae (shoebill)
 Family Pelecanidae (pelicans)
 Family Threskiornithidae (ibises)

Order Eurypygiformes (sunbitterns and kagus) 

 Family Eurypygidae (sunbitterns)
 Family Rhynochetidae (kagus)

Order Phaethontiformes (tropicbirds) 

 Family Phaethontidae

Order Cathartiformes (New World vultures) 

 Family Cathartidae

Order Accipitriformes (birds of prey, such as hawks and eagles) 

 Family Accipitridae (hawks, eagles, Old World vultures, and more)
 Family Pandionidae (pandion)
 Family Sagittariidae (secretarybird)

Order Strigiformes (owls) 

 Family Strigidae (true owls)
 Family Tytonidae (barn-owls)

Order Coliiformes (mousebirds) 

 Family Coliidae

Order Leptosomiformes (cuckoo roller) 

 Family Leptosomidae

Order Trogoniformes (trogons) 

 Family Trogonidae

Order Bucerotiformes (hornbills and hoopoes) 

 Family Bucerotidae (true hornbills)
 Family Bucorvidae (ground hornbills)
 Family Phoeniculidae (wood hoopoes)
 Family Upupidae (hoopoe)

Order Coraciiformes (kingfishers, bee-eaters, and more) 

 Family Alcedinidae (kingfishers)
 Family Brachypteraciidae (ground-rollers)
 Family Coraciidae (rollers)
 Family Meropidae (bee-eaters)
 Family Momotidae (motmots)
 Family Todidae (todies)

Order Piciformes (woodpeckers, puffbirds, barbets, toucans, and relatives) 

 Suborder Galbuli
 Family Bucconidae (puffbirds and relatives)
 Family Galbulidae (jacamars)
 Suborder Pici
 Family Capitonidae (American barbets)
 Family Indicatoridae (honeyguides)
 Family Lybiidae (African barbets)
 Family Megalaimidae (Asian barbets)
 Family Picidae (woodpeckers, piculets and wrynecks)
 Family Ramphastidae (toucans)
 Family Semnornithidae (toucan-barbets)

Order Cariamiformes (seriemas) 

 Family Cariamidae

Order Falconiformes (falcons and caracaras) 

 Family Falconidae

Order Psittaciformes (parrots) 

 Family Cacatuidae (cockatoos)
 Family Nestoridae (kea and New Zealand kaka)
 Family Psittacidae (various "true" parrots)
 Family Psittaculidae (lovebirds, fig parrots, lories, tiger parrots, pygmy parrots, and more)
 Family Psittrichasiidae (Pesquet's parrot and vasa parrots)
 Family Strigopidae (kakapo)

Order Passeriformes (passerines) 
 Suborder Acanthisitti
 Family Acanthisittidae (New Zealand wrens)
 Suborder Passeri (songbirds)
 Infraorder Climacterides
 Family Climacteridae (Australian treecreepers)
 Family Ptilonorhynchidae (bowerbirds)
 Infraorder Corvides
 Family Mohouidae (whitehead, yellowhead, and pipipi)
 Family Pachycephalidae (whistlers)
 Family Oreoicidae (Australo-Papuan bellbirds)
 Family Falcunculidae (crested shriketits)
 Family Psophodidae (quail-thrushers and jewel-babblers)
 Family Eulacestomidae (wattled ploughbills)
 Family Neosittidae (sittellas)
 Family Oriolidae (Old World orioles and figbirds)
 Family Paramythiidae (painted berrypeckers)
 Family Psophodidae (whipbirds and wedgebills)
 Family Vireonidae (vireos)
 Family Campephagidae (cuckoo-shrikes and trillers)
 Family Artamidae (woodswallows, butcherbirds, currawongs, and Australian magpie)
 Family Machaerirhynchidae (boatbills)
 Family Aegithinidae (ioras)
 Family Pityriaseidae (Bornean bristlehead)
 Family Malaconotidae (bushshrikes)
 Family Platysteiridae (wattle-eyes)
 Family Vangidae (vangas)
 Family Dicruridae (drongos)
 Family Ifritidae (blue-capped ifrit)
 Family Melampittidae (melampittas)
 Family Corcoracidae (Australian mudnesters)
 Family Paradisaeidae (birds-of-paradise)
 Family Monarchidae (monarch flycatchers)
 Family Laniidae (shrikes)
 Family Corvidae (crows, ravens, and jays)
 Family Colluricinclidae (strike-thrushes)
 Infraorder Meliphagides
 Family Maluridae (Australasian wrens)
 Family Dasyornithidae (bristlebirds)
 Family Meliphagidae (honeyeaters)
 Family Pardalotidae (pardalotes)
 Family Acanthizidae (Australasian warblers)
 Infraorder Menurides
 Family Menuridae (lyrebirds)
 Family Atrichornithidae (scrub-birds)
 Infraorder Orthonychides
 Family Orthonychidae (logrunners)
 Family Pomatostomidae (pseudo-babblers)
 Infraorder Passerides
 Family Melanocharitidae (berrypeckers and longbills)
 Family Cnemophilidae (satinbirds)
 Family Callaeidae (New Zealand wattlebirds)
 Family Notiomystidae (stitchbird)
 Family Petroicidae (Australian robins)
 Family Picathartidae (rockfowl)
 Family Chaetopidae (rock-jumpers)
 Family Eupetidae (Malaysian rail-babbler)
 Family Stenostiridae (flycatcher-tits)
 Family Hyliotidae (hyliotas)
 Family Remizidae (penduline tits)
 Family Paridae (true tits, chickadees, and relatives)
 Family Nicatoridae (nicators)
 Family Panuridae (bearded reedling)
 Family Alaudidae (larks)
 Family Macrosphenidae (African warblers)
 Family Cisticolidae (cisticolas)
 Family Acrocephalidae (marsh-warblers and tree-warblers)
 Family Pnoepygidae (pygmy wren-warblers)
 Family Locustellidae (grass-warblers)
 Family Donacobiidae (black-capped donacobius)
 Family Bernieridae (Malagasy warblers)
 Family Hirundinidae (swallows and martins)
 Family Pycnonotidae (bulbuls)
 Family Phylloscopidae (leaf-warblers)
 Family Cettiidae (ground-warblers)
 Family Hyliidae (hylas)
 Family Aegithalidae (long-tailed tits)
 Family Sylviidae (typical warblers, parrotbills, and relatives)
 Family Zosteropidae (white-eyes)
 Family Timaliidae (tree babblers)
 Family Pellorneidae (ground babblers)
 Family Leiothrichidae (laughingthrushes)
 Family Regulidae (kinglets)
 Family Elachuridae (spotte elachura)
 Family Ptiliogonatidae (silky flycatchers)
 Family Bombycillidae (waxwings)
 Family Dulidae (palmchat)
 Family Hypocoliidae (hypocolius)
 Family Tichodromadidae (wallcreeper)
 Family Sittidae (nuthatches)
 Family Certhiidae (treecreepers)
 Family Salpornithidae (spotted creepers)
 Family Troglodytidae (New World wrens)
 Family Polioptilidae (gnatcatchers)
 Family Cinclidae (dippers)
 Family Turdidae ("true" thrushes)
 Family Muscicapidae (Old World flycatchers and chats)
 Family Buphagidae (oxpeckers)
 Family Sturnidae (starlings)
 Family Mimidae (mockingbirds and thrashers)
 Family Promeropidae (sugarbirds)
 Family Arcanatoridae (spot-throat, dapple-throat, and grey-chested babbler)
 Family Dicaeidae (flowerpeckers)
 Family Nectariniidae (sunbirds)
 Family Chloropseidae (leafbirds)
 Family Irenidae (fairy-bluebirds)
 Family Urocynchramidae (Przewalski's finch)
 Family Peucedramidae (olive warbler)
 Family Prunellidae (accentors)
 Family Ploceidae (weavers)
 Family Viduidae (indigobirds and whydahs)
 Family Estrildidae (estrildid finch)
 Family Passeridae (true sparrows)
 Family Motacillidae (wagtails and pipits)
 Family Fringillidae (true finches)
 Family Calcariidae (longspurs and snow buntings)
 Family Emberizidae (buntings)
 Family Passerellidae (American sparrows)
 Family Icteridae (icterids, such as New World blackbirds)
 Family Parulidae (New World warblers)
 Family Thraupidae (tanagers)
 Family Cardinalidae (cardinals)
 Family Scotocercidae (streaked scrub warbler)
 Family Rhagologidae (mottled whistler)
 Family Prionopidae (helmetshrikes and woodshrikes)
 Suborder Tyranni (suboscines)
 Family Pittidae (pittas)
 Family Eurylaimidae (broadbills)
 Family Philepittidae (asities)
 Family Sapayoidae (broad-billed sapayoa)
 Family Pipridae (manakins)
 Family Cotingidae (cotingas)
 Family Tityridae (tityras)
 Family Oxyruncidae (sharpbills)
 Family Onychorhynchidae (royal flycatchers and relatives)
 Family Pipritidae (piprites)
 Family Platyrinchidae (spadebills)
 Family Tachurididae (many-colored rush tyrants)
 Family Rhynchocyclidae (mionectine flycatchers)
 Family Tyrannidae (tyrant flycatchers)
 Family Melanopareiidae (crescentchests)
 Family Thamnophilidae (antbirds)
 Family Conopophagidae (gnateaters and gnatpittas)
 Family Grallariidae (antpittas)
 Family Rhinocryptidae (typical tapaculos)
 Family Formicariidae (antthrushes)
 Family Furnariidae (ovenbirds and woodcreepers)

Superorder Notopalaeognathae

Order Rheiformes 

 Family Rheidae

Order Tinamiformes 

 Family Tinamidae (tinamou)

Order Casuariiformes 

 Family Casuariidae (cassowaries)
 Family Dromaiidae (emu)

Order Apterygiformes 

 Family Apterygidae (kiwi)

Superorder Struthionimorphae

Order Struthioniformes 

 Family Struthionidae (ostriches)

Reptilia

Order Crocodilia (crocodiles) 

 Family Gavialidae (gharial and false gharial)
 Family Alligatoridae (alligators and caimans)
 Family Crocodylidae (true crocodiles)

Order Rhynchocephalia (tuatara) 

 Family Sphenodontidae (one species: tuatara)

Order Squamata (lizards and snakes) 

 Family Amphisbaenidae (tropical worm lizards)
 Family Bipedidae (other worm lizards)
 Family Blanidae (Mediterranean worm lizards)
 Family Cadeidae (Cuban worm lizards)
 Family Rhineuridae (North American warm lizards)
 Family Trogonophidae (palearctic worm lizards)
 Family Dibamidae (blind lizards)
 Family Gekkonidae (geckos)
 Family Pygopodidae (legless lizards)
 Family Diplodactylidae  
 Family Carphodactylidae 
 Family Eublepharidae 
 Family Sphaerodactylidae 
 Family Phyllodactylidae 
 Family Agamidae (agamas)
 Family Chamaeleonidae (chameleons)
 Family Corytophanidae (casquehead lizards)
 Family Crotaphytidae (collared lizards)
 Family Iguanidae (true iguanas and relatives)
 Family Leiocephalidae 
 Family Hoplocercidae 
 Family Dactyloidae 
 Family Leiosauridae
 Family Liolaemidae (iguana relatives, such as swifts)
 Family Opluridae (Madagascan iguanas)
 Family Phrynosomatidae (spiny lizards, horn lizards, tree lizards, and more)
 Family Polychrotidae (anoles)
 Family Tropiduridae (neotropical ground lizards)
 Family Gymnophthalmidae (spectacled lizards)
 Family Lacertidae (wall lizards)
 Family Teiidae (tegus)
 Family Anguidae (slowworms, glass lizards, and alligator lizards)
 Family Anniellidae (American legless lizards)
 Family Helodermatidae (gila monsters)
 Family Xenosauridae (knob-scaled lizards)
 Family Lanthanotidae (earless monitor)
 Family Shinisauridae (Chinese crocodile lizard)
 Family Varanidae (monitor lizards)
 Family Cordylidae (spinytail lizards)
 Family Gerrhosauridae (plated lizards)
 Family Scincidae (skinks)
 Family Xantusiidae (night lizards)
 Family Acrochordidae (file snakes)
 Family Aniliidae (coral pipe snakes)
 Family Anomochilidae (dwarf pipe snakes)
 Family Boidae (boas)
 Family Bolyeriidae (Round Island boas)
 Family Colubridae (colubrids)
 Family Cylindrophiidae (Asian pipe snakes)
 Family Elapidae (cobras, sea snakes, and more)
 Family Homalopsidae (mudsnakes)
 Family Lamprophiidae
 Family Loxocemidae (Mexican burrowing snakes)
 Family Pareidae (slug snakes and more)
 Family Pythonidae (pythons)
 Family Tropidophiidae (dwarf boas)
 Family Uropeltidae (shieldtail snakes)
 Family Viperidae (vipers, rattlesnakes, and more)
 Family Xenodermatidae
 Family Xenopeltidae (sunbeam snakes)
 Family Anomalepidae (dawn blind snakes)
 Family Gerrhopilidae (Indo-Malayan blind snakes)
 Family Leptotyphlopidae (slender blind snakes)
 Family Typhlopidae ("true" blind snakes)
 Family Xenotyphlopidae

Order Testudines (turtles) 

 Family Carettochelyidae (pig-nosed turtle)
 Family Cheloniidae (sea turtles)
 Family Chelydridae (snapping turtles)
 Family Dermatemydidae (Central American river turtle)
 Family Dermochelyidae (leatherback sea turtle)
 Family Emydidae (pond turtles)
 Family Geoemydidae (Asian box turtles)
 Family Kinosternidae (mud turtles)
 Family Platysternidae (big-headed turtle)
 Family Testudinidae (tortoises)
 Family Trionychidae (softshell turtles)
 Family Chelidae (Austro-American sideneck turtles)
 Family Pelomedusidae (Afro-American sideneck turtles)
 Family Podocnemididae (South American side-necked river turtles, and 2 other species)

Mammalia

Group Prototheria (monotremes)

Order Monotremata 

 Family Ornithorhynchidae (platypus)
 Family Tachyglossidae (echidnas)

Group Marsupialia (marsupials)

Order Dasyuromorphia (marsupial mice and numbat) 

 Family Dasyuridae (marsupial mice)
 Family Myrmecobiidae (numbat)

Order Didelphimorphia (opossums) 

 Family Didelphidae

Order Diprotodontia (koalas, wombats, kangaroos, and more) 

 Suborder Macropodiformes (kangaroos, wallabies, bettongs, and more)
 Family Hypsiprymnodontidae (rat kangaroos)
 Family Macropodidae (kangaroos, wallabies, and wallaroos)
 Family Potoroidae (bettongs and potoroos)
 Suborder Phalangeriformes (possums, gliders, and cuscus)
 Family Acrobatidae (feathertail glider and feather-tailed possum)
 Family Burramyidae (pygmy possums)
 Family Petauridae (striped possum, trioks, gliders, and leadbeater's possum)
 Family Phalangeridae (cuscuses and brushtail possums)
 Family Pseudocheiridae (ringtailed possums)
 Family Tarsipedidae (honey possum)
 Suborder Vombatiformes (koala, wombats, and multiple extinct species)
 Family Phascolarctidae (koala)
 Family Vombatidae (wombats)

Order Microbiotheria (monito del monte) 

 Family Microbiotheriidae

Order Notoryctemorphia (marsupial moles) 

 Family Notoryctidae

Order Paucituberculata (shrew opossums) 

 Family Caenolestidae

Order Peramelemorphia (marsupial omnivores) 

 Family Thylacomyidae (bilbies)
 Family Peramelidae (bandicoots)

Group Placentalia (placental mammals)

Order Afrosoricida (golden moles and tenrecs) 

 Family Chrysochloridae (golden moles)
 Family Tenrecidae (tenrecs)

Order Carnivora (carnivorans, such as dogs, cats, and relatives) 

 Suborder Feliformia (cat-like carnivorans and relatives)
 Family Nandiniidae (African palm civet)
 Family Prionodontidae (Asiatic linsangs)
 Family Felidae (domestic cats, leopards, lynxes, tigers, lions, cougars, and cat relatives)
 Family Viverridae (civets, African linsangs, and genets)
 Family Hyaenidae (hyenas and aardwolf)
 Family Eupleridae (Malagasy carnivorans)
 Family Herpestidae (mongooses)
 Suborder Caniformia (dog-like carnivorans and relatives)
 Family Canidae (domestic dogs, foxes, wolves, jackals, and relatives)
 Family Ursidae (bears and giant panda)
 Family Odobenidae (walrus)
 Family Otariidae (eared seals)
 Family Phocidae (true seals)
 Family Ailuridae (red panda)
 Family Mephitidae (skunks and stink badgers)
 Family Mustelidae (weasels and relatives)
 Family Procyonidae (raccoons, coatis, olingos, ringtail cats, and relatives)

Order Cetartiodactyla (even-toed ungulates) 

 Suborder Ruminantia
 Family Tragulidae (chevrotain)
 Family Moschidae – musk deer)
 Family Cervidae – deer)
 Family Bovidae – hollow-horned ungulates)
 Family Antilocapridae – pronghorn)
 Family Giraffidae – giraffe and okapi)
 Suborder Suina
 Family Suidae (pigs)
 Family Tayassuidae (peccaries)
 Suborder Tylopoda
 Family Camelidae (camels and relatives)
 Suborder Whippomorpha
 Family Hippopotamidae (hippopotamuses)
 Infraorder Cetacea
 Parvorder Mysticeti (Baleen whales)
 Family Balaenidae (right and bowhead whales)
 Family Cetotheriidae (pygmy right whale)
 Family Eschrichtiidae (gray whale)
 Family Balaenopteridae (rorquals)
 Parvorder Odontoceti (Toothed whales)
 Family Physeteridae (sperm whale)
 Family Kogiidae (pygmy and dwarf sperm whales)
 Family Ziphiidae (beaked whales)
 Family Platanistidae (South Asian river dolphin)
 Family Iniidae (Amazon river dolphins)
 Family Lipotidae (baiji)
 Family Pontoporiidae (franciscana)
 Family Monodontidae (narwhal and beluga)
 Family Delphinidae (oceanic dolphins)
 Family Phocoenidae (porpoises)

Order Chiroptera (bats) 

 Suborder Yangochiroptera
 Family Emballonuridae (sac-winged bats)
 Family Furipteridae
 Family Molossidae (free-tailed bats)
 Family Mormoopidae
 Family Mystacinidae (New Zealand short-tailed bats)
 Family Myzopodidae (sucker-footed bats)
 Family Natalidae (funnel-eared bats)
 Family Noctilionidae (bulldog bats)
 Family Nycteridae (hollow-faced bats)
 Family Phyllostomidae (leaf-nosed bats)
 Family Thyropteridae (disk-winged bats)
 Family Vespertilionidae (vesper bats)
 Suborder Yinpterochiroptera
 Family Craseonycteridae (Kitti's hog-nosed bat (also known as the bumblebee bat))
 Family Hipposideridae (Old World leaf-nosed bats)
 Family Megadermatidae (false vampire bats)
 Family Pteropodidae (megabats)
 Family Rhinolophidae (horseshoe bats)
 Family Rhinopomatidae (mouse-tailed bats)

Order Cingulata (armadillos) 

 Family Chlamyphoridae (fairy armadillos, giant armadillos, and more)
 Family Dasypodidae

Order Dermoptera (colugos) 

 Family Cynocephalidae (colugos, or flying lemurs)

Order Eulipotyphla (hedgehogs, shrews, and moles) 

 Family Erinaceidae (Hedgehog)
 Family Soricidae (Shrew)
 Family Talpidae (Mole)
 Family Solenodontidae

Order Hyracoidea (hyraxes) 

 Family Procaviidae

Order Lagomorpha (rabbits, hares, and pikas) 

 Family Leporidae (rabbits and hares)
 Family Ochotonidae (pikas)

Order Macroscelidea (elephant shrews) 

 Family Macroscelididae (Elephant shrew)

Order Perissodactyla (odd-toed ungulates)

 Suborder Hippomorpha
 Family Equidae (horses and relatives)
 Suborder Ceratomorpha
 Family Rhinocerotidae (rhinoceros)
 Family Tapiridae (tapirs)

Order Pholidota (pangolins) 

 Family Manidae (Pangolin)

Order Pilosa (anteaters and sloths) 

 Suborder Vermilingua
 Family Cyclopedidae (Silky anteater)
 Family Myrmecophagidae
 Suborder Folivora
 Family Bradypodidae (three-toed sloths)
 Family Megalonychidae (two-toed sloths)

Order Primates (primates, such as monkeys and apes) 

  Suborder Haplorhini
  Infraorder Simiiformes
  Parvorder Catarrhini (Old world monkey)
 Superfamily Cercopithecoidea
 Family Cercopithecidae
 Superfamily Hominoidea
 Family Hominidae (great apes)
 Family Hylobatidae (lesser apes)
 Parvorder Platyrrhini (New world monkey)
 Family Aotidae
 Family Atelidae
 Family Callitrichidae
 Family Cebidae
 Family Pitheciidae
  Infraorder Tarsiiformes
 Family Tarsiidae
  Suborder Strepsirrhini
  Infraorder Lemuriformes
 Superfamily Lemuroidea (lemurs and relatives)
 Family Cheirogaleidae
 Family Daubentoniidae
 Family Indriidae
 Family Lemuridae
 Family Lepilemuridae
 Superfamily Lorisoidea
 Family Galagidae (bushbaby and galago)
 Family Lorisidae (loris and potto)

Order Proboscidea (elephants) 

 Family Elephantidae

Order Rodentia (rodents) 

 Suborder Anomaluromorpha
 Family Anomaluridae
 Suborder Castorimorpha
 Family Castoridae
 Family Geomyidae (Pocket gopher)
 Family Heteromyidae (Pocket mouse)
 Suborder Hystricomorpha
 Family Ctenodactylidae
 Family Diatomyidae
 Family Caviidae
 Family Cuniculidae
 Family Dasyproctidae
 Family Abrocomidae
 Family Chinchillidae
 Family Dinomyidae
 Family Erethizontidae
 Family Capromyidae
 Family Ctenomyidae
 Family Echimyidae
 Family Octodontidae
 Family Bathyergidae (Mole-rat)
 Family Heterocephalidae
 Family Hystricidae
 Family Petromuridae
 Family Thryonomyidae
 Suborder Myomorpha
 Family Dipodidae (Jerboa and Jumping mouse)
 Family Calomyscidae
 Family Cricetidae
 Family Muridae
 Family Nesomyidae
 Family Platacanthomyidae
 Family Spalacidae
 Suborder Sciuromorpha
 Family Aplodontiidae
 Family Gliridae
 Family Sciuridae

Order Scandentia (treeshrews) 

 Family Ptilocercidae
 Family Tupaiidae

Order Sirenia (sea cows) 

 Family Dugongidae
 Family Trichechidae

Order Tubulidentata (aardvark) 

 Family Orycteropodidae

Tetrapod families